Albuna pyramidalis, the fireweed clearwing moth, is a species of clearwing moth in the family Sesiidae.

The MONA or Hodges number for Albuna pyramidalis is 2533.

References

Further reading

External links

 
 

Sesiidae
Moths described in 1856